Alpha Sigma Nu is the honor society of Jesuit colleges and universities. ΑΣΝ is a member of the Association of College Honor Societies. Founded in 1915 at Marquette University as Alpha Sigma Tau, it adopted the current name in 1930. The society  is open to both men and women of every academic discipline in the Association of Jesuit Colleges and Universities and other Jesuit higher education institutions worldwide. It is present in 32 Jesuit institutions of higher education, 28 of which are in the United States. Alpha Sigma Nu currently has over 90,000 lifetime members and admits around 1,000 new members each year.

History
In 1915, the original society, Alpha Sigma Tau was founded by John Danihy, S.J. He was the dean of journalism at Marquette University, in Wisconsin, United States. He sought to emulate the various honor societies present in the country at the time. Furthermore, Catholic higher education institutes found their students being overlooked in other honor societies at the time.

In 1921, the second chapter of the society was founded in Creighton University in Nebraska, United States. In 1925, a women-only society, Gamma Pi Epsilon, was founded. It had the same purpose as Alpha Sigma Nu, but the two societies remained independent of each other. In 1930, Alpha Sigma Tau became Alpha Sigma Nu. On March 30, 1973, the two, Alpha Sigma Nu and Gamma Pi Epsilon merged.

Alpha Sigma Nu joined the Association of College Honor Societies in 1975.

Chapters
As of 2016, the society has 32 chapters: 28 Jesuit Colleges and Universities in the United States, 2 Colleges in Canada, 1 in South Korea, and 1 in Spain. These chapters were given charters as follows:

In addition, Alpha Sigma Nu granted charters in 1993 to both Jesuit School of Theology in Berkeley, California and Weston Jesuit School of Theology in Cambridge, Massachusetts, however the Jesuit School of Theology affiliated with Santa Clara University in 2009 and the Weston Jesuit School of Theology re-affiliated with Boston College in 2008.

Awards

In 1979, Alpha Sigma Nu created the Alpha Sigma Nu Jesuit Book Awards. The aim of the awards was to recognize publishing achievement at Jesuit colleges and universities the categories of the humanities, the sciences and professional studies.

Purpose
The purpose of the Society shall be to honor students of Jesuit institutions of higher education who distinguish themselves in scholarship, loyalty and service; to honor persons who may or may not be Alumni of Jesuit institutions of higher education who have distinguished themselves in scholarship, loyalty and service in their intellectual, civic, religious, professional or commercial pursuits; to band together and to encourage those so honored to understand, to appreciate and to promote the ideals of Jesuit education; to encourage the establishment and proper functioning of Chapters in accredited Jesuit institutions of higher education; and to encourage the establishment and proper functioning of Alumni Clubs.

Mission:  Alpha Sigma Nu, the honor society of Jesuit institutions of higher education, recognizes those students who distinguish themselves in scholarship, loyalty and service.  The only honor society permitted to bear the name Jesuit, ΑΣΝ encourages its members to a lifetime pursuit of intellectual development, deepening Ignatian spirituality, service to others, and a commitment to the 
core principles of Jesuit education.

Scholarship

Scholarship is the most important qualification for membership in Alpha Sigma Nu, as this tenet reflects the primary purpose of higher education.  True scholarship, however, runs deeper than a high grade point average or the mastery of information and specialized knowledge. Alpha Sigma Nu recognizes those persons as scholars who possess a depth of comprehension and a breadth of knowledge.

Loyalty

To be loyal to these ideals means developing a full engagement with the real with a deep sense of decency and responsibility to truth and justice.  It will always entail personal integrity as well as an abiding effort to advance the good of society and the well-being of all.

Service

St. Ignatius has said that love is shown in deeds, not merely in words, and so service to others is an integral part of the philosophy of Jesuit education and thus of Alpha Sigma Nu.  Knowledge should not exist in a vacuum; it should be used to build up and ennoble the world in which we live.  This is why a distinguished academic record is not sufficient to warrant admission to Alpha Sigma Nu.  There must be a proven dimension of willing and generous service to others.

See also
Association of Jesuit Colleges and Universities
List of Jesuit educational institutions

References

External links
 
 Alpha Sigma Nu at Association of College Honor Societies

Association of College Honor Societies
Student organizations established in 1915
 
1915 establishments in Wisconsin